Rakkhosh is a Hindi-language psychological thriller drama film where the camera is the lead character of the film. It is a first-person POV of a schizophrenic person. The film is an adaptation of a Marathi short story titled "Patient 302", by late Shri Narayan Dharap, who is a well-known writer in Marathi Literature in horror genre.

Rakkhosh bagged the "Special Jury Award for Best Director in Hindi Film" at the Rajasthan International Film Festival, that took place in Jaipur between 19 and 23 January 2019.

Plot 
The film explores the horrors and fantasies of a patient trapped in a mental asylum.

Birsa is a mental patient with a history of abuse from his father and elder brother. He's sent to mental asylum from where he draws a parallel between his life in an asylum and that at his home.

Production 
Produced by Santosh Deshpande and Sayali Deshpande and helmed by Prashen H. Kyawal as Creative Producer and produced by SD Motion Pictures Pvt Ltd.

Produced by SD Motion Pictures, this film stars Sanjay Mishra, Tannishtha Chatterjee, Priyanka Bose, and Barun Chanda in lead characters. Actor Namit Das has given voice the character of Birsa, from whose POV, the story is narrated.

The film is touted as the first POV film of India to be shot on professional cinema camera (Red Dragon 6K). French DOP Basile Pierrat had been hired to shoot this film, who had to create a custom POV rig for the Red Camera. The film made the official selection at Pune International Film Festival (PIFF), the Rajasthan International Film Festival (RIFF) and the Orange City International Film Festival (OCIFF) to be held between January and February 2019.

Cast 
 Sanjay Mishra as KumarJohn
 Namit Das as Birsa Sekhri (voice)
 Barun Chanda as Dr. Idris Shah
 Priyanka Bose as Ridhima
 Tannishtha Chatterjee as Soma Sekhri
 Ashwath Bhatt as Dr. Partho
 Sangramsingh Thakur as Mental Patient
 Arijit Dutta as Biswal Sekhri
 Ravikant Soitkar as Devesh Sekhri
 Rohit Gill as Patient

Recognition 
To date, Rakkhosh has received following nominations:

 Official Selection Shanghai International Film Festival, China, 2019
 Official Selection FantaFestival, Rome, 2019
 Official Selection Pune International film festival (PIFF).
 Official Selection Rajasthan International film festival (RIFF).
 Official Selection Orange City International Film Festival (OCIFF).

References

External links  
 

2019 films
2019 drama films
Indian drama films
2010s Hindi-language films